Hell's Angels was Boeing B-17F Flying Fortress used during the Second World War. It was the first heavy bomber in the 8th Air Force to complete 25 combat missions in the European Theater. Ultimately, Hell’s Angels would go on to complete 48 missions without any crewman injured or being forced to turn back.

References 

Individual aircraft of World War II
Boeing B-17 Flying Fortress